Basti Division is an administrative geographical unit of Uttar Pradesh state of India. Basti is the administrative headquarters of the division. Currently (2005), the division consists following districts: Basti district and Basti division carved out from Gorakhpur district.

References

 
Divisions of Uttar Pradesh